Phoenicolacerta laevis, the Lebanon lizard, is a species of lizard in the family Lacertidae.
It is found in Israel, west Jordan, Lebanon, north-west Syria and south Turkey.
Its natural habitats are temperate forest, Mediterranean-type shrubby vegetation, rocky areas, arable land, pastureland, plantations, and rural gardens.
It is threatened by habitat loss.

References

Phoenicolacerta
Reptiles described in 1838
Taxa named by John Edward Gray
Taxonomy articles created by Polbot